Xu Zhiming (born 29 January 1980) is a former Chinese judoka who competed in the 2000 Summer Olympics.

References

1980 births
Living people
Chinese male judoka
Olympic judoka of China
Judoka at the 2000 Summer Olympics
Place of birth missing (living people)
21st-century Chinese people